The Southern Military Region (MR S) is a Swedish military region within the Swedish Armed Forces. Established in 2013, the military region staff in based in Revingeby. The military region includes Skåne County, Blekinge County, Kronoberg County, Jönköping County, Kalmar County and Östergötland County.

History
The Southern Military Region was formed on 1 January 2013 as Military Region South, as one of four military regions in Sweden. The military region includes Skåne County, Blekinge County, Kronoberg County, Jönköping County, Kalmar County and Östergötland County. The region's staff is located in Revingeby with the task of leading surveillance and protection tasks, implementing civil-military cooperation and support to society. The Southern Military Region is also responsible for leading the production of the training groups and the Home Guard units in south of Sweden. The responsibility involves both training personnel for the Home Guard units and leading them in operations. The Southern Military Region's Home Guard battalions are 11 in number. On 1 October 2018, a separate command position was appointed for Military Region South. From 2019, the name Southern Military Region was adopted. From 1 January 2020, all military regions are independent units subordinate to the Chief of Home Guard. In doing so, the regions also take over the command in peacetime from the training groups with their Home Guard battalions. Each military region has production management responsibility. This meant that five training groups were transferred to the Southern Military Region. In a government's bill, however, the Swedish government emphasized that the military regional division could be adjusted, depending on the outcome of the investigation Ansvar, ledning och samordning inom civilt försvar ("Responsibility, leadership and coordination in civil defense").

Units

Current units
Skånska gruppen (SKG)
46th Home Guard Battalion/South Scanian Battalion
47th Home Guard Battalion/Malmöhus Battalion
48th Home Guard Battalion/South Dragoon Battalion
49th Home Guard Battalion/North Scanian Battalion
Blekingegruppen (BLG)
36th Home Guard Battalion/Western Blekinge Battalion
37th Home Guard Battalion/Eastern Blekinge Battalion
Kalmar och Kronobergsgruppen (KRAG)
34th Home Guard Battalion/Kalmar Battalion
35th Home Guard Battalion/Kronoberg Battalion
Norra Smålandsgruppen (NSG)
33rd Home Guard Battalion/Northern Småland Battalion
Livgrenadjärgruppen (LVG)
30th Home Guard Battalion/1st Life Grenadier Battalion
31st Home Guard Battalion/2nd Life Grenadier Battalion

Heraldry and traditions

Coat of arms
Blazon of the coat of arms of the Central Military Region: "Azure, a wyvern or, armed and langued gules. The shield surmounting an erect sword or."

Commanding officers
From 2013 to 2017, the military region commander was also commander of the Norrbotten Regiment. From 2018 to 2020, military region commander was subordinate to the Chief of Joint Operations in territorial activities as well as in operations. Furthermore, the military region commander has territorial responsibility over his own military region and leads territorial activities as well as regional intelligence and security services. From 1 January 2020, all military region commanders are subordinate to the Chief of Home Guard.

2013–2015: Colonel Michael Nilsson
2015–2015: Lieutenant colonel Peter Nilsson
2015–2017: Colonel Stefan Smedman
2017–2018: Lieutenant colonel Peter Nilsson (acting)
2018–2021: Colonel Jan Pålsson
2021–20xx: Colonel Per Nilsson

Names, designations and locations

See also
Southern Military District (Milo N)

Footnotes

References

External links
 

Military regions of Sweden
Military units and formations established in 2013
2013 establishments in Sweden